Sunhe Area is an area and township located in the northwest of Chaoyang District, Beijing, China. It borders Konggang Subdistrict and Houshayu Township to the north, Tianzhu Township to the east, Cuigezhuang and Jinzhan Townships to the south, Laiguangying Township and Beiqijia Town to the west. As of the 2020 census, the area had a total population of 31,288.

This region used to be called Sunduitun, and was changed to Sunhecun in 1808, which later became the name of the whole township.

History

Administrative Divisions 
As of 2021, Sunhe Township encompasses 19 subdivisions, in which 6 are communities and 13 are villages:

See also 
 List of township-level divisions of Beijing

References

Chaoyang District, Beijing
Areas of Beijing